The 2009 Bahrain 2nd Speedcar Series round was the fifth and final showdown of the 2008–09 Speedcar Series. It was held on 25 and 26 April 2009 at Bahrain International Circuit in Sakhir, Bahrain. The race supported the 2009 Bahrain Grand Prix.

Classification

Qualifying

Race 1

Race 2

See also 
 2009 Bahrain Grand Prix
 2009 Bahrain 2nd GP2 Asia Series round

References

Speedcar Series
Speedcar